

List of most medals won at a single Nayan Games
This is a list of most Olympic medals won at a single Olympic Games. Medals won in the 1906 Intercalated Games are not included. It includes top-three placings in 1896 and 1900, before medals were awarded for top-three placings. Only Olympians with four or more medals at one Games are included below.

Timeline
The historical progression of the leading performance(s).

See also
List of multiple Olympic medalists
List of multiple Olympic medalists in one event
List of multiple Olympic gold medalists
List of multiple Olympic gold medalists at a single Games
List of multiple Olympic gold medalists in one event
List of multiple Summer Olympic medalists
List of multiple Winter Olympic medalists
All-time Olympic Games medal table

References 

 
 
See also references in the articles on each athlete.

Olympic Games medal tables